The 1995 PSA Men's Detjen World Open Squash Championship is the men's edition of the 1995 World Open, which serves as the individual world championship for squash players. The event took place in Nicosia in Cyprus from 6 November to 11 November 1995. Jansher Khan won his seventh World Open title, defeating Del Harris in the final.

Seeds

Draw and results

See also
PSA World Open
1995 Women's World Open Squash Championship

References

External links
World Squash History

World Squash Championships
M
1995 in Cypriot sport
20th century in Nicosia
Squash in Cyprus
Sport in Nicosia
International sports competitions hosted by Cyprus